Donald F. Oliver (July 3, 1954 – May 18, 2018) was an American politician. He served as a Democratic member for the 1-1 district of the Georgia House of Representatives.

Life and career 
Oliver was born in Catoosa County, Georgia. He attended Chattanooga Valley High School and the University of Georgia School of Law.

In 1983, Oliver was elected to represent the 1-1 district of the Georgia House of Representatives, succeeding Wayne Snow Jr. He resigned in 1986 and was succeeded by Mike Snow.

Oliver died in May 2018, at the age of 63.

References 

1954 births
2018 deaths
People from Catoosa County, Georgia
Democratic Party members of the Georgia House of Representatives
20th-century American politicians
University of Georgia School of Law alumni